Adriana Soares Parente (born 14 April 1980), known as Drika, is a Brazilian professional footballer who plays as a centre back for Série A3 club Legião FC. She has been a member of the Brazil women's national team.

International career
Drika was called up to train with the senior Brazil women's national football team in 2000 and 2009.

Controversy
From 2008 to 2016, Drika made appearances for Equatorial Guinea despite having no connection with the African nation. She was a member of the squads that won two Africa Women Cup of Nations editions (2008 and 2012). On 5 October 2017, she and other nine Brazilian footballers were declared by FIFA as ineligible to play for Equatorial Guinea.

References

External links

1980 births
Living people
Sportspeople from Tocantins
Brazilian women's footballers
Women's association football central defenders
FC Energy Voronezh players
FC Zorky Krasnogorsk (women) players
Clube de Regatas do Flamengo (women) players
Sociedade Esportiva Palmeiras (women) players
Legião Futebol Clube players
Campeonato Brasileiro de Futebol Feminino Série A1 players

Equatorial Guinea women's international footballers

Brazilian expatriate women's footballers
Brazilian expatriate sportspeople in Russia
Expatriate women's footballers in Russia